Greenhalgh-with-Thistleton is a civil parish in the Borough of Fylde, Lancashire, England.  It contains five buildings that are recorded in the National Heritage List for England as designated listed buildings, all of which are listed at Grade II.  This grade is the lowest of the three gradings given to listed buildings and is applied to "buildings of national importance and special interest".  Other than small settlements, the parish is rural, and the listed buildings consist of three farmhouses, a cottage, and a barn.

Buildings

References

Citations

Sources

Lists of listed buildings in Lancashire
Buildings and structures in the Borough of Fylde